The UCI Gravel World Championships are the world championship events for gravel cycling in the disciplines of cross country. They are organized by the Union Cycliste Internationale (UCI), the governing body of world cycling. The discipline covers the space between standard road cycling on paved and asphalted roads, and the all-terrain disciplines of mountain bike cross-country and cyclo-cross. The races share the length and tactical nature of road racing parcours, but embrace the unpredictability and technical skill of off-road cycling.

The first three finishers in each discipline at the World Championships are awarded gold, silver, and bronze medals. The winner of each discipline is also entitled to wear the rainbow jersey in events of the same discipline until the following year's World Championships. Unlike other UCI-sanctioned mountain-bike races, the competitors in the World Championships represent national rather than commercial teams. The World Championships are usually held towards the end of the season.

History

The first UCI Gravel World Championships took place in Veneto, Italy in 2022 and featured only cross-country events. The inaugural world champions were Pauline Ferrand-Prévot for the women's race and Gianni Vermeersch for the men's race.

Venues

All medals
Updated after 2022 UCI Gravel World Championships.

References

External links
 UCI Website

Gravel
Recurring sporting events established in 2022